Loni Bhapkar is a village located in the Baramati Tehsil of Pune District, India. The Maratha Bhapkars clan built a fort at this place. The ancient temple of Shri Mallikarjun Mahadev temple attracts people to the village., Know more about village Loni Bhapkar Click here

Temples

References 

Villages in Pune district